Ethmiopsis subtegulifera is a moth in the family Gelechiidae. It was described by Ponomarenko in 1994. It is found in the Russian Far East and Japan.

References

Ethmiopsis
Moths described in 1994